James M. Kurtenbach (born February 20, 1957) is an American politician in the state of Iowa.

Kurtenbach was born in Waterloo, Iowa. He attended Iowa State University, the University of Tulsa, and University of Missouri (PhD) and is an academic, working as professor at Iowa State University. A Republican, he served in the Iowa House of Representatives from 2003 to 2007 (10th district).

References

1957 births
Living people
Politicians from Waterloo, Iowa
University of Tulsa alumni
University of Missouri alumni
Iowa State University alumni
Iowa State University faculty
Republican Party members of the Iowa House of Representatives